WTKM-FM (104.9 FM) is a full service radio station located in Hartford, Wisconsin, which serves the Milwaukee metropolitan area. WTKM is owned by Tomsun Media, LLC, broadcasting a community-oriented format which consists of classic country, and local news/talk programming.

Through they played other styles of music, through 2017 WTKM was somewhat famous as one of the only full time polka format radio stations in the United States and had a fiercely loyal listener base where some listeners built antennas just to receive their signal; polka is no longer programmed on the station.

WTKM-FM began broadcasting in 1973 when WTTN-FM in Watertown (now WJJO), moved from 104.7 to 94.1 FM so that WTKM could apply for an FM license on 104.9 MHz. The station's signal covers mostly the northwestern portion of the Milwaukee area.

References

External links
WTKM Website

TKM-FM